The Return of Luk Siu-fung is a 1986 Hong Kong television series adapted from Gu Long's Lu Xiaofeng novel series. The series was first aired on TVB in Hong Kong in 1986.

Cast
 Note: Some of the characters' names are in Cantonese romanisation.

 Alex Man as Luk Siu-fung
 Wong Wan-choi as Fa Mun-lau
 Austin Wai as Sai-mun Chui-suet
 Rebecca Chan as Pak Ching-ching
 King Doi-yum as Sit Bing
 Lau Kong as Lau-wan Koi-see
 Yung Wai-man as Ngau Yuk-tong
 Ng Ka-lai as Muk-yung Sheung
 Leung Kit-wah as Suen Sau-ching
Au-yeung Yiu-chuen as Truthful Monk
 Leung Hung-wah as Si-hung Chak-sing
 Yan Pak as Yuk Lo-cha
 Chan Ka-yee as Kung-suen Lan
 Lee Lung-kei as Fa Yuet-lau
 Lee Heung-kam as Mrs Fa
 Chan Wai-yu as Mrs Sit
 Sandra Ng as Kei-kei
 Leung Chi-fong as Dan-dan
 Chu Tit-wo as Kam Kau-ling
 Ko Miu-see as Lei Hap
 Lau Dan as Lam Wu-chi
 Ho Lei-nam
 Cheng Fun-sang
 Tsang Do-may
 Lau Miu-ling

References

External links

1986 Hong Kong television series debuts
1986 Hong Kong television series endings
TVB dramas
Hong Kong wuxia television series
Works based on Lu Xiaofeng (novel series)
Cantonese-language television shows
Television shows based on works by Gu Long